Alfonso Casasempere (9 April 1910 – 6 July 1994) was a Chilean swimmer. He competed in the men's 100 metre backstroke at the 1936 Summer Olympics.

References

External links
 

1910 births
1994 deaths
Chilean male backstroke swimmers
Olympic swimmers of Chile
Swimmers at the 1936 Summer Olympics
Place of birth missing
Male backstroke swimmers
20th-century Chilean people